Back in Town is a 1959 album by Mel Tormé and his Mel-Tones, arranged by Marty Paich.

Track listing 
 "Makin' Whoopee" (Walter Donaldson, Gus Kahn) – 2:50
 "Baubles, Bangles, & Beads" (George Forrest, Robert Wright) – 2:14
 "What Is This Thing Called Love?" (Cole Porter) – 2:54
 "I've Never Been in Love Before" (Frank Loesser) – 2:57
 "Truckin (Rube Bloom, Ted Koehler) – 3:30
 Bunch of the Blues: "Keester Parade"/"TNT"/Tiny's Blues" (Cy Touff, Richie Kamuca)(Tiny Kahn, Johnny Mandel) – 4:28
 "It Happened in Monterey" (Billy Rose, Mabel Wayne) – 2:48
 "I Hadn't Anyone Till You" (Ray Noble) – 3:36
 "A Smooth One" (Benny Goodman, Ernie Royal) – 2:57
 "Don't Dream of Anybody But Me" (Neal Hefti, Bart Howard) – 2:43
 "Some Like It Hot" (Ray Biondi, Gene Krupa, Loesser) – 3:34
 "Hit the Road to Dreamland" (Harold Arlen, Johnny Mercer) – 2:24

Personnel 
 Mel Tormé – vocals, arranger
 The Mel-Tones:
 Sue Allen
 Tom Kenny
 Ginny O'Connor
 Bernie Parke
 Victor Feldman – vibraphone
 Marty Paich – piano, celesta, organ, arranger
 Art Pepper – alto saxophone
 Jack Sheldon – trumpet
 Bobby Gibbons – guitar
 Barney Kessel
 Bill Pitman
 Tony Rizzi
 Tommy Tedesco
 Joe Mondragon – double bass
 Mel Lewis – drums

References 

1959 albums
Mel Tormé albums
Albums arranged by Marty Paich
Verve Records albums